The 1975 Mr. Olympia contest was an IFBB professional bodybuilding competition held November 4–11, 1975 in Pretoria, South Africa.  It was the 11th Mr. Olympia competition and the feature event of the 1975 IFBB International Congress.

The event was filmed for the 1977 docudrama Pumping Iron which featured the rivalry between competitors Arnold Schwarzenegger and Lou Ferrigno as they trained for the contest.  Although not released until two years after the event, the success of the film made Arnold Schwarzenegger an international celebrity, contributed to his success as Hollywood actor, and helped establish bodybuilding as a professional sport.

Results
The total prize money awarded was $2,500.

Over 200lbs

Under 200lbs

Overall winner

Notable events
Arnold Schwarzenegger won his sixth consecutive Mr. Olympia title and announced his retirement from professional bodybuilding, although he would later come out of retirement to compete in the 1980 Mr. Olympia

References

External links 
 Mr. Olympia
 The 1975 IFBB Mr. Universe - Pretoria, South Africa

 1975
1975 in South African sport
1975 in bodybuilding
Bodybuilding competitions in South Africa
Sports competitions in Pretoria